Marcos Baghdatis was the defending champion, but did not compete in the Juniors in this year.

Gaël Monfils defeated Josselin Ouanna (6–0, 6–3) in the final.

Seeds

Draw

Finals

Top half

Section 1

Section 2

Bottom half

Section 3

Section 4

Sources
Draw

Boys' Singles
Australian Open, 2004 Boys' Singles